Romain Rambier (born 29 August 1981) is a French former professional footballer who played as a right-back.

Career
He played on the professional level in Segunda División for Racing Ferrol and in Ligue 2 for Libourne.

References

External links
 

1981 births
Living people
AS Cannes players
Association football defenders
Castelnau Le Crès FC players
Championnat National players
Championnat National 2 players
Expatriate footballers in Spain
FC Cartagena footballers
FC Libourne players
FC Sète 34 players
Footballers from Montpellier
French beach soccer players
French expatriate footballers
French expatriate sportspeople in Spain
French footballers
Ligue 2 players
Racing de Ferrol footballers
Thonon Evian Grand Genève F.C. players